The 2012–13 Samford Bulldogs basketball team represented Samford University during the 2012–13 NCAA Division I men's basketball season. The Bulldogs, led by first year head coach Bennie Seltzer, played their home games at the Pete Hanna Center and were members of the North Division of the Southern Conference. They finished the season 11–21, 9–9 in SoCon play to finish in a tie for third place in the North Division. They lost in the first round of the SoCon tournament to Furman.

Roster

Schedule

|-
!colspan=9| Exhibition

|-
!colspan=9| Regular season

|-
!colspan=9| 2013 Southern Conference men's basketball tournament

References

Samford Bulldogs men's basketball seasons
Samford
Samford Bulldogs bask
Samford Bulldogs bask